Socket may refer to:

Mechanics
 Socket wrench, a type of wrench that uses separate, removable sockets to fit different sizes of nuts and bolts
 Socket head screw, a screw (or bolt) with a cylindrical head containing a socket into which the hexagonal ends of an Allen wrench will fit
 Socket termination, a termination used at the ends of wire rope
 Socket, the receptacle into which a tapered tool is inserted
 Socket, an opening in any fitting that matches the outside diameter of a pipe or tube

Biology
 Eye socket, a region in the skull where the eyes are positioned
 Tooth socket, a cavity containing a tooth, in those bones that bear teeth
 Dry socket, an opening as a result of the blood not clotting after a tooth is pulled
 Ball and socket joint

Computing
 Network socket, an end-point in a communication across a network or the Internet
 Unix domain socket, an end-point in local inter-process communication
 socket(), a system call defined by the Berkeley sockets API
 CPU socket, the connector on a computer's motherboard for the CPU

Electrical connectors
 AC power plugs and sockets, electrical devices used to connect to a power source onto which another device can be plugged or screwed in
 Antenna socket, a female antenna connector for a television cable
 Jack (connector), one of several types of electronic connectors
 Lightbulb socket, a connector into which a lamp light bulb screws

Other uses
 Socket (telecommunications), a US based Internet and phone service provider
 Socket (video game), a video game created by Vic Tokai on the Sega Genesis
 Socket (film), a 2007 film

See also
 IC socket (disambiguation)
Websocket